Shasta Bible College and Graduate School (SBC&GS) is a private Baptist college and graduate school in Redding, California. It is accredited by the Transnational Association of Christian Colleges and Schools (TRACS). SBC&GS has online and on-campus programs leading to certificates, diplomas and degrees in both Biblical Studies and Christian Teacher Education, and both undergraduate and graduate degrees. SBC is known for its emphasis in Bible study and interpretation, Biblical languages, evangelism, apologetics, theology, and Christian Teacher Education and School Administration. Shasta Bible College is uniquely known for offering a course on how to memorize the Bible taught by Professor Tom Meyer.

References

External links
 

Universities and colleges in Shasta County, California
Bible colleges
Seminaries and theological colleges in California